The domain-to-range ratio (DRR) is a ratio which describes how the number of outputs corresponds to the number of inputs of a given logical function or software component. The domain-to-range ratio is a mathematical ratio of cardinality between the set of the function's possible inputs (the domain) and the set of possible outputs (the range). For a function defined on a domain, and a range, the domain-to-range ratio is given as:It can be used to measure the risk of missing potential errors when testing the range of outputs alone.

Example 
This solution takes advantage of the fact that integer division in programming typically rounds towards zero. 
bool isEven(unsigned short x) {
    return (x / 2) == ((x + 3)/2 - 1);
Therefore, the domain-to-range ratio of isEven() is given by:Here, the domain-to-range ratio indicates that this function would require a comparatively large number of tests to find errors. Because errors in functions with a high domain-to-range ratio are difficult to identify via manual testing or methods which reduce the number of tested inputs, such as orthogonal array testing or all-pairs testing, more computationally complex techniques may be used, such as fuzzing or static program analysis, to find errors.

References 

Software metrics
Software testing
Set theory